Fishing for Souls is a 1614 oil on panel painting by the Dutch Golden Age artist Adriaen van de Venne in the collection of the Rijksmuseum.

Painting
Fishing for Souls shows an allegory of the jealousy between the various religious denominations during the Twelve Years' Truce between the Dutch Republic and Spain. The river signifies the split between the Northern and the Southern Netherlands that occurred with the Beeldenstorm. In the original painting the Protestant fishermen had successfully fished up some believers while the Catholic nets were empty. The "souls" near the Catholic boats were added later. On the left bank are the two princes of Orange behind an orange tree branch; Maurice and Frederick Henry. They are accompanied by Frederick V, Elector Palatine, King James I of England and the young Louis XIII of France with his mother Maria de' Medici. On the right bank of the river are the Catholic cardinals carrying their pope accompanied by Albert and Isabella. The various attributes of the fishermen (nets, boats, etc.) are labelled with Latin text to clarify the meaning. A large fly is painted on as a trompe-l'œil wink to Jan Brueghel the Elder, who created many similar amusing allegories with visual jokes in them.

Provenance

This painting has been considered a highlight of the collection since it was bought in 1808 and has been included in all Highlights of the Rijksmuseum catalogs. It was appropriated for the national art collection in September 1798 during the French occupation for the National Kunst Galerie in the Hague, from the collections of Prince Willem V. This appropriation was a tactical move to secure certain works from being abducted by the French to Paris, which had happened with the larger part of Prince Willem's gallery in 1795 after the prince fled to England. Fishing for Souls has remained in the national collection ever since.

References

 SK-A-447 painting record on museum website

1600s paintings
Paintings in the collection of the Rijksmuseum
Maritime paintings
Books in art
Dogs in art
Insects in art
Bathing in art